Alico Arena is a  multipurpose arena on the campus of Florida Gulf Coast University in Fort Myers, Florida. It is the home of the FGCU Eagles volleyball and men's and women's basketball teams. It holds 4,633 people in basketball configuration. It also features four practice courts, six suites, twelve locker rooms, and the offices of the Athletics Department.

Alico, a Florida agribusiness with ties to the university, paid for the arena's naming rights.

See also
List of NCAA Division I basketball arenas

References

External links
Facilities - Alico Arena

Basketball venues in Florida
College basketball venues in the United States
Florida Gulf Coast Eagles men's basketball
Sports venues in Fort Myers, Florida
2002 establishments in Florida
Sports venues completed in 2002
College volleyball venues in the United States